This is the complete list of Youth Olympic medalists in cycling.

Current program

Boy's events

Team

Girl's events

Team

Mixed events

Team

Cycling at the Youth Olympics
Lists of Youth Olympic medalists

BMX racing

BMX Freestyle park